Wrightsboro is a census-designated place (CDP) in New Hanover County, North Carolina,  United States. At the 2010 census, the population was 4,896, up from 4,496 in 2000. It is part of the Wilmington Metropolitan Statistical Area.

Geography
Wrightsboro is located at  (34.291425, -77.926063).

Landmark
 Tinga Nursery was listed on the National Register of Historic Places in 2000.

Demographics

2020 census

As of the 2020 United States census, there were 5,526 people, 1,777 households, and 1,105 families residing in the CDP.

2000 census
At the 2000 census, there were 4,496 people, 1,777 households and 1,284 families residing in the CDP. The population density was 418.9 per square mile (161.8/km). There were 1,897 housing units at an average density of 176.7/sq mi (68.3/km). The racial makeup of the CDP was 63.99% White, 33.59% African American, 0.62% Native American, 0.20% Asian, 0.02% Pacific Islander, 0.56% from other races, and 1.02% from two or more races. Hispanic or Latino of any race were 1.53% of the population.

There were 1,777 households, of which 33.3% had children under the age of 18 living with them, 53.9% were married couples living together, 14.9% had a female householder with no husband present, and 27.7% were non-families. 23.4% of all households were made up of individuals, and 7.3% had someone living alone who was 65 years of age or older. The average household size was 2.53 and the average family size was 2.97.

25.6% of the population were under the age of 18, 7.1% from 18 to 24, 31.2% from 25 to 44, 25.1% from 45 to 64, and 11.0% who were 65 years of age or older. The median age was 37 years. For every 100 females, there were 94.3 males. For every 100 females age 18 and over, there were 89.2 males.

The median household income was $37,876 and the median family income was $40,327. Males had a median income of $31,667 compared with $24,173 for females. The per capita income for the CDP was $17,681. About 6.5% of families and 10.5% of the population were below the poverty line, including 19.6% of those under age 18 and 8.0% of those age 65 or over.

References

Census-designated places in New Hanover County, North Carolina
Census-designated places in North Carolina
Cape Fear (region)